Cocatherium is an extinct genus of marsupial mammals of uncertain family placement, from the earliest Paleocene (early Danian) of South America, predating the Tiupampan South American land mammal age. The genus was described based on a fossil molar that was found in the Danian part of the Cretaceous-Paleogene Lefipán Formation in the Cañadón Asfalto Basin in north-central Patagonia, Argentina. The type species of the genus is C. lefipanum.

The mammal, probably belonging to the Polydolopimorphia, is the oldest known representative of marsupials or any therian mammal in the Southern Hemisphere.

Etymology 
The genus was named Cocatherium ("Coca Beast") after "Coca", the nickname of San Martín of Estancia San Ramón, who assisted the researchers of the Museo de La Plata in working in the region where the fossils were found. The species epithet lefipanum honors Lefipán, one of the most prominent native Mapuche inhabitants of the region where the Lefipán Formation was deposited.

Description 
The molar has a well-developed wear pattern, contains all the features characteristic of a therian mammal and indicates it belonged to a bunodont marsupial of relatively large size. The mammal is the oldest known representative of marsupials or any therian mammal in the Southern Hemisphere. The presence of the mammal predates the Tiupampan South American land mammal age.

Classification 
Cocatherium probably represents a basal polydolopiform, closely related to Roberthoffstetteria. Polydolopoids are dentally derived marsupials primarily from the Paleocene and Eocene of South America. At least two genera are known from Antarctica. According to the describing authors, the genus possibly belongs to the ?Polydolopimorphia, together with other North and South American genera as Iugomortiferum from the Campanian Wahweap Formation of Utah, Bonapartherium from the Casamayoran Lumbrera Formation and Mustersan Geste Formation of Argentina, Epidolops of the Itaboraian Las Flores Formation of the Golfo San Jorge Basin, Polydolops from Eocene Argentina, La Meseta Formation of Antarctica and Deseadan Salla Formation of Bolivia, Prepidolops, from the Lumbrera Formation, Ectocentrocristus, from the Maastrichtian Judith River and Kirtland Formations of the United States, Roberthoffstetteria of the Tiupampan Santa Lucía Formation of Bolivia, Procaroloameghinia of Las Flores Formation, and Caroloameghinia from the Casamayoran Sarmiento Formation of Argentina.

Paleoecology 

The Lefipán Formation ranges in age from the late Maastrichtian to the early Danian and preserves the Cretaceous-Paleogene boundary, though the exact layer is disturbed by bioturbation. The Danian section of the formation shows a remarkably rapid recovery from the extinction event, with aquatic plant taxa virtually undisturbed and other flora reappearing quickly.

The formation has provided several macro- and microfossils of flora, which has led researchers to conclude the rapid recovery and low extinction rate of several genera and families of plants. Hemipteran insect predation on leaves is noted at levels slightly above the K/Pg boundary. While Cocatherium is the only mammal found in the formation, shark, and ray teeth of Hypolophodon patagoniensis, occur in the Danian section and are indicative of a shallow marine to littoral (coastal) environment.

See also 
 Chulpasia, from Early Eocene (Itaboraian) Peru
 Didelphodon, from Campanian to Maastrichtian North America
 Eodelphis, from Campanian North America

References

Bibliography 
 
 
 
 
 
 
 

Prehistoric marsupial genera
Paleocene mammals of South America
Paleogene Argentina
Fossils of Argentina
Cañadón Asfalto Basin
Fossil taxa described in 2006
Taxa named by Francisco J. Goin
Danian genera